Blaine may refer to:

People 
Blaine (given name)
Blaine (surname)
Blaine (cartoonist), Canadian political cartoonist

Places in the United States 
 Blaine, Georgia, an unincorporated community
 Blaine, Idaho, an unincorporated community
 Blaine, Illinois, an unincorporated community
 Blaine, Indiana, an unincorporated community
 Blaine, Kansas, an unincorporated community
 Blaine, Kentucky, a city
 Blaine, Maine, a town
 Blaine (CDP), Maine, a census-designated place within the town
 Blaine, an unincorporated community in Grant Township, St. Clair County, Michigan
 Blaine, Minnesota, a city
 Blaine, Mississippi, an unincorporated community
 Blaine, Missouri, an unincorporated community
 Menoken, North Dakota, a census-designated place originally named Blaine
 Blaine, Ohio, an unincorporated community
 Blaine, Tennessee, a city
 Blaine, Washington, a city
 Blaine Air Force Station, a now closed radar station
 Blaine, West Virginia, an unincorporated community
 Blaine, Wisconsin, a town
 Blaine, Portage County, Wisconsin, an unincorporated community 
 Blaine County (disambiguation)
 Blaine Township (disambiguation)
 Blaine Island, South Charleston, West Virginia

Schools 
 Blaine High School (Minnesota), Blaine, Minnesota
 Blaine High School (Washington), Blaine, Washington

See also 
 
 
 Blaine method, a method of measuring the fineness of a powder material
 Blain (disambiguation)
 Blane (disambiguation)

es:Anexo:Líderes de Gimnasio de Kanto#Blaine